Fly Me Europe AB, operating as FlyMe, was a low-cost airline based in Gothenburg, Sweden. It operated flights from Gothenburg, Stockholm and Malmö to destinations within Europe. Its main hub was Göteborg Landvetter Airport, with hubs at Malmö Airport and Stockholm-Arlanda Airport. Beginning in April 2006, it widened its destination network and started daily services to European destinations. Majority owner of the business was English Billionaire John Robert Porter and his Norwegian business partner Christen Ager-Hanssen. They also had a majority interest in another airline Global Supply Systems a British all cargo carrier. FlyMe acquired in late 2006 a 25% stake in Global Supply Systems holding company Riverdon ltd with the aim to create a low cost long haul product.
 
The airline ceased operations on 2 March 2007.

History 

The airline was founded in 2003 and started operations on 1 March 2004. It employed 104 staff.

On 2 March 2007, FlyMe announced that it would file for bankruptcy due to an unwillingness by its banks to release further funding; this decision was based on proceeds from a rights issue by its parent company. FlyMe accordingly cancelled all its flights.

Destinations 
Before its grounding, FlyMe operated to the following destinations:
Czech Republic 	
Prague (Ruzyně International Airport) 	
Finland 	
Helsinki
France 	
Beauvais (Beauvais-Tillé Airport) 	
Marseille (Marseille Provence Airport) 	
Nice (Nice Côte d'Azur Airport) 	
Germany 	
Düsseldorf (Düsseldorf Airport)
Greece 	
Chania (Chania International Airport) 	
Rhodes (Rhodes International Airport, "Diagoras") 	
Italy 	
Bologna (Bologna Airport) 	
Rimini (Federico Fellini International Airport) 	
Rome (Ciampino Airport) 	
Netherlands
Amsterdam (Schiphol)
Spain 	
Alicante (Alicante Airport) 	
Barcelona (Barcelona International Airport) 	
Málaga (Málaga Airport) 	
Palma de Mallorca (Son Sant Joan Airport)
Sweden 	
Gothenburg (Göteborg Landvetter Airport)
Helsingborg	
Luleå (Luleå Airport) 	
Malmö (Malmö Airport) 	
Stockholm (Stockholm-Arlanda Airport)
Sundsvall
Östersund	
Turkey 	
Istanbul (Sabiha Gökçen International Airport) 	
United Kingdom 	
London (London Stansted)

Fleet 
The FlyMe fleet consisted of the following aircraft (as of August 2006):
5 Boeing 737-300
1 Boeing 737-500

The average age of the FlyMe fleet was 16.7 years as of February 2007.

See also
 Airlines
 Transport in Sweden

References

External links

flyme.com
FlyMe Fleet
 FlyMe bankruptcy in English and in Swedish

Defunct airlines of Sweden
Defunct European low-cost airlines
Airlines established in 2003
Airlines disestablished in 2007
Organizations based in Gothenburg
Swedish companies established in 2003
Swedish companies disestablished in 2007